Myoma Myint Kywe (pronounced [mjo̰ mə-mjɪ̰ɴ tɕwɛ̀]; also U Myint Kywe; 14 April 1960 – 26 July 2021) was a famous Burmese writer and historian.

He was awarded the Sarpay Beikman Manuscript Awards First Prize for 2003 in the belles-lettres  category. In 2007, he was awarded Myanmar Culture and Fine Arts Literature Prize for 2005.
He was born in Rangoon, Burma on 14 April 1960, son of Burmese politician Myoma U Than Kywe and Daw Ahmar (a) Myint Myint Win. He was the youngest son of four siblings.

See also 
 Myoma U Than Kywe

References

1960 births
2021 deaths
20th-century Burmese historians
Burmese journalists
21st-century Burmese historians
People from Yangon
Deaths from the COVID-19 pandemic in Myanmar